Ratnakīrti (11th century CE) was an Indian Buddhist philosopher of the Yogācāra and epistemological (pramāṇavāda) schools who wrote on logic, philosophy of mind and epistemology. Ratnakīrti studied at the Vikramaśīla monastery in modern-day Bihar. He was a pupil of Jñānaśrīmitra, and Ratnakīrti refers to Jñānaśrīmitra in his work as his guru with phrases such as yad āhur guravaḥ.

Ratnakīrti's work has been termed as "more concise and logical though not so poetical" compared to that of his teacher, although he does build on much of Jñānaśrīmitra's work.
He was one of the last Buddhist philosophers in India.

Philosophy
Ratnakīrti's "Refutation of Other mindstreams" (Santānāntaradūṣaṇa) argued that knowledge of external streams of consciousness (citta-santāna) is a form of inference (anumāna) and not direct perception (pratyakṣa). Ratnakīrti introduced the two truths doctrine as key to the nature of the discussion. Since inference deals with conceptual universals, the proof of the mindstreams of others, whilst empirically valid in relative truth (saṃvṛtisatya), does not hold ultimate metaphysical certainty in absolute truth (paramārthasatya). Ratnakīrti, therefore, argued for the ultimate truth of only "one mind" (ekacitta). By establishing the impossibility of external mindstreams, Ratnakīrti was also arguing for the non-dualism of Yogācāra "consciousness-only". Ratnakīrti argued that from an ultimate point of view, the distinctions between a subject and object, or the observer and the observed, all disappear. Ratnakīrti's theory states that there is no logical foundation for individuating mindstreams, and that there are no boundaries between minds from the perspective of ultimate truth. This sub-school of Yogācāra, Cittamātra (mind only), is also known as the Citrādvaitavāda school (non-dual mind) or Vijñānādvaitavāda school (non-dual consciousness).

Ratnakīrti's "Refutation of Arguments Establishing Īśvara" (Īśvarasādhanadūṣaṇa) argued against the Hindu concept of a creator God. He wrote that it is not possible to establish Īśvara through inference as the Naiyāyikas did. Although the mindstreams of others are regarded as relatively true, they are not ultimately true.The text begins with an explanation of the Nyāya belief system, followed by a criticism of inferences which establish an intelligent creator.

Ratnakīrti's "Proof of Exclusion" (Apohasiddhi) establishes a theory of exclusion which follows Dignāga's theory of the same. It explains how thoughts and perception become understood through inference, and it is a theory of definitions and meaning-making. There are three types of exclusion described in the text.[2]

Works
Works attributed to Ratnakīrti include:

Apohasiddhi - In this work, he explains the three types of exclusion.
Īśvarasādhanadūṣaṇa - This work critiques the way of knowing a singular deity.
Kṣaṇabhaṅgasiddhi ( anvayātmikā ) - In this work, he defended the theory of momentariness, the view that dharmas last only for a moment. 
Kṣaṇabhaṅgasiddhi ( vyatirekātmikā ) - The world is illusory and only relatively true.
Citrādvaitaprakāśavāda - The mind manifests awareness variously and non-dually. This awareness takes the form of a single image, and the various aspects of the image comprise perception.
Pramāṇāntarbhāvaprakaraṇa - This work explained the epistemology of Ratnakīrti.
Vyāptinirṇaya - It was inspired by the Vyāpticarcā of Jñānaśrīmitra and clarified the main ideas about the limits of pervasiveness.
Santānāntaradūṣaṇa - This is a proof of solipsism as the way to highest truth.
Sarvajñasiddhi - Ratnakīrti's perfection of knowledge.
Sthirasiddhidūṣaṇa - This text rejects the permanence of dharmas.
Udayanīrakaranam - 

The works are compiled in Ratnakīrtinibandhāvali.

See also
 Dharmakīrti
 Non-dualism
 Yogācāra

Notes

 8. McAllister, Patrick. "Ratnakirti and Dharmottara on the Object of Activity." Journal of Indian Philosophy; Dordrecht Vol. 42, Iss. 2-3, (Jun 2014): 309-326. 

11th-century Buddhist monks
Buddhist logic
Buddhist writers
History of logic
Idealists
Indian scholars of Buddhism
Monks of Vikramashila
Yogacara